"Speak to a Girl" is a song recorded by American country music artists Tim McGraw and Faith Hill. The song was written by Shy Carter, Dave Gibson, and Joe Spargur.

The track was released on March 23, 2017, as the first single from McGraw and Hill's first ever duets album, The Rest of Our Life. McGraw and Hill performed the song live for the first time at the Academy of Country Music Awards held April 2, 2017. The song is also featured in the couple's Soul2Soul: The World Tour set list.

As of June 2017, the song has sold 200,000+ copies in the United States. According to Billboard, the song got 12.7 million first-week audience impressions.

Charts

Weekly charts

Year-end charts

References

2017 songs
2017 singles
Tim McGraw songs
Faith Hill songs
Arista Nashville singles
Songs written by Shy Carter
Songs written by Joe London
Song recordings produced by Byron Gallimore
Song recordings produced by Tim McGraw
Male–female vocal duets
Songs written by Dave Gibson (Scottish singer-songwriter)